Shimulpur is a census town in the Gaighata CD block in the  Bangaon subdivision of North 24 Parganas district in the state of West Bengal, India.

Geography

Location

Area overview
The area shown in the map was a part of Jessore district from 1883. At the time of Partition of Bengal (1947) the Radcliffe Line placed the police station areas of Bangaon and Gaighata of Jessore district in India and the area was made a part of 24 Parganas district. The renowned novelist, Bibhutibhushan Bandopadhyay (of Pather Panchali fame) belonged to this area and many of his writings portray his experience in the area. It is a flat plain located in the lower Ganges Delta. In the densely populated area, 16.33% of the population lives in the urban areas and 83.67% lives in the rural areas.

Note: The map alongside presents some of the notable locations in the subdivision. All places marked in the map are linked in the larger full screen map.

Demographics
According to the 2011 Census of India, Shimulpur had a total population of 20,803, of which 10,504 (50%) were males and 10,299 (50%) were females. Population in the age range 0-6 years was 1,868. The total number of literate persons in Shimulpur was 15,758 (83.22% of the population over 6 years).

Infrastructure
According to the District Census Handbook, North Twenty Four Parganas,  2011, Shimulpur covered an area of 5.8747 km2. It had 17 km roads, with both open and closed drains. The protected water-supply involved hand pumps. It had 5,230 domestic electric connections. Among the educational facilities, it had 39 primary schools, 2 middle schools, 1 secondary school and 1 higher secondary school. The nearest college was 5 km away at Gobardanga. It had branches of 3 nationalised banks, 1 private commercial bank, 2 cooperative banks, 3 agricultural credit societies.

References

Cities and towns in North 24 Parganas district